Margaret E. Porter is a Democratic former member of the New Hampshire House of Representatives, representing the Merrimack 8th District starting in 2006.

External links
New Hampshire House of Representatives - Margaret E. Porter official NH House website
Project Vote Smart - Representative Margaret Porter (NH) profile
Follow the Money - Margaret Porter
2006 2002 campaign contributions

Members of the New Hampshire House of Representatives
Living people
Women state legislators in New Hampshire
Year of birth missing (living people)
21st-century American women